The Frankfurt–Bebra railway runs from Bebra to Frankfurt am Main via Fulda, Gelnhausen, Hanau and Offenbach am Main in south central Germany. The southern  section between Fulda and Frankfurt is known as the Kinzig Valley railway due to the route it follows through the Kinzig Valley.

This important north–south link was planned by the Electorate of Hesse-Kassel as the Bebra–Hanau railway but was first opened under Prussian management. This line was extended as far as Frankfurt under the name Frankfurt–Bebra railway. Today it is part of the Intercity-Express (ICE) lines from north and central Germany to Frankfurt. Just as important is the Regional-Express connexion from Fulda to Frankfurt and the Stadt-Express link from Wächtersbach to Frankfurt. With the Main–Weser Railway it is one of the most important north–south freight lines in central Germany.

History
When railways began to be built in Germany in the nineteenth century the two largest cities of the Hesse-Kassel (Kurhessen), which had been re-established by the Congress of Vienna in 1815, were its capital Kassel and the city of Hanau in its far south. Initially it was not practical to build a railway to connect Kurhessen through the mountainous country between Hanau and Fulda. Instead a railway was established jointly by the three countries of Kurhessen, the Grand Duchy of Hesse and Free City of Frankfurt, and completed between Frankfurt and Kassel in 1852. Meanwhile, the private Frankfurt–Hanau railway was opened in 1848, allowing a connection between Kassel and Hanau via Frankfurt, although the lines were not physically linked.

With improvements to railway technology, it became more practical to build a railway between Kassel and Hanau via almost exclusively on Kurhessen territory. The Kurhessen Parliament passed a law authorising the construction of a railway in 1863.

Construction
The Friedrich Wilhelm North Railway (Friedrich-Wilhelms-Nordbahn) already connected  Bebra with Kassel. Initially the proposed railway was called the Bebra-Hanau railway (German: Bebra-Hanauer Eisenbahn). In order not to leave Kurhessen territory, the line followed the route of the Haune valley, not that of the Fulda, which was in the territory of the Grand Duchy of Hesse. Therefore, a winding route was necessary.

After the annexation of the Electorate of Hesse-Kassel by Prussia as a result of the Austro-Prussian War in 1866, the project was taken over by Prussia. At the same time construction of the southern section commenced. Prussia was able to complete the line within two years, and trains began to run between Hanau and Frankfurt, initially via the Frankfurt-Hanau railway and the Frankfurt City Link Line (Verbindungsbahn) on the northern bank of the Main to Frankfurt's western stations. In 1873 the bridge over the Main at Hanau-Steinheim was completed, which enabled trains to run on the newly built track via Offenbach am Main, Frankfurt Bebra Station and the Main-Neckar Railway bridge (now the location of the "Freedom" road bridge—Friedensbrücke) into Frankfurt. This new route avoided the old Hanau station and this required a new, larger station to be built on the line in order to continue to serve Hanau at the point where the Frankfurt-Bebra line intersected with the Main–Spessart railway on its way to Aschaffenburg, initially called Hanau East, and later renamed Hanau central station.

Later changes
The mountains between Flieden and Schlüchtern south of Fulda initially led to the decision to build a zig zag line in order to avoid building an almost 4 km long tunnel. This required all through trains to reverse at Elm, which led to increasing congestion as traffic increased with the connection of the Flieden–Gemünden railway to the line at Elm in 1873. Tunnel-building technology had improved significantly by the beginning of the 20th century, notably with the increased availability of dynamite. Thus in 1909 construction of the Schlüchtern tunnel began under Distelrasen; it was completed on 14 February 1914 and put into operation on 1 May. In 2009 a second tube was opened and the old tunnel is now being rebuilt as a single-track tunnel.

In 1914, a compound curve was opened to the south of Bebra allowing trains to run without reversal or stop at Bebra between the line from Frankfurt to the Thuringian Railway to Leipzig and Berlin; this line has become commonly known as the Berlin curve.

In 1963 electrification of the line was completed.

Operations

Since it was built, the traffic load on the line has changed several times. Until the Second World War it was used primarily to transport on the Frankfurt–Leipzig line. As a result of the division of Germany, this east–west traffic came to a standstill, except for transit trains from West Germany to West Berlin and the inter-zonal trains between West and East Germany which now ran with a locomotive change and a reversal in Bebra. This meant that the main traffic shifted to the north–south direction, from Hanover and Hamburg to Frankfurt and also via the Fulda–Main line towards Bavaria. This meant that the historical line is now divided into several parts for operational purposes:
The Frankfurt–Hanau south bank line 
The Kinzig Valley Railway between Hanau and Fulda
the Bebra–Fulda railway, connecting with the Flieden–Gemünden line (Fulda–Main line) via the Kinzig Valley Railway near Flieden.

References

 

Railway lines in Hesse
High-speed railway lines in Germany
Transport in Frankfurt

ro:Calea ferată Kitzingtal